Beppe Costa (born Concetto Costa, on , Catania, Italy) is an Italian poet, novelist and publisher.

Biography

The beginning 
Born into a poor family grows, however, in an environment rich in books.
He published the first volume of poems in 1970(Una poltrona comoda, Giuseppe Di Maria editore), characterized, like the others that follow, by the theme of love and nonconformity.
Beppe Costa Beppe wrote and published two tour guides, first at local level, Catania, Guida ai monumenti, and the second at regional level, Sicilia, Guida ai monumenti, both with Muglia publisher.
Translated two books of the playwright Fernando Arrabal.
In 1978 he met the poet Dario Bellezza which will begin with poetry readings and book presentations all around Italy, using everywhere is available: squares, bars, libraries, theaters.

Successes 
He reaches fame with the book :it:Romanzo Siciliano, that treat the autobiographical story of an intellectual Sicilian in his struggle and his complaint the south and the Mafia.

In the United States the novel is reviewed by World Literature Today.

Beppe Costa collaborated until 1985 with articles on Giornale del Sud and in Siciliani both directed by Giuseppe Fava. He publishes in Giornale di Sicilia interviews to Alberto Moravia, Enzo Jannacci, Léopold Sédar Senghor, Leo Ferré. He also participates
to the radio program of poetry by :it:RadioRai named Zenit & Nadir.
In 1985 he finally left Sicily.
He public other collections of poems and receive the Akesineide prize for Fatto d'amore and Canto d'amore.

In 1989 wins the Alfonso Gatto prize with the collection Impaginato per affetto. 
The preface is by :it:Giacinto Spagnoletti, who, first, recognized the artistic talent of Pier Paolo Pasolini, positively appreciates the poetry of Beppe Costa, in which beautifully expresses the pain of living, the need to love and the difficulty of harmonizing this with the reality of another world.
The book will be presented in different school, The book will be presented in different schools in common with the same Spagnoletti and, in Rome, from Giorgio Bassani.

His poems were read by actors like :it:Lina Bernardi, Arnoldo Foà, Viviana Piccolo, Sara Pusceddu e Valeria Di Francesco and set to music, among others, by da Giovanni Renzo, Alessandra Celletti, Nicola Alesini, Giuliano Perticara, Mario Pettenati, and Gianluca Attanasio.
Fascinated by the musical innovations, Beppe Costa recorded a cd with Giovanni Renzo. This experience led him quickly to make visual poetry with photos and music videos mostly of René Aubry and Alessandra Celletti.
He inaugurate, with Beatrice Niccolai, in 2008, the exhibition Malaspinarte.

In 2008 the encounter with the poet and composer Mario Salis contributes to greater synergy to the Italian edition of the Teranova Festival, who was born in France and founded by : fr: Mario Salis under the leadership of Fernando Arrabal, has already seen the participation of Lawrence Ferlinghetti, Patrice Leconte and of the same Arrabal.

An event of enormous importance in March 2010 for the cycle Beppe Costa meetings, Fernando Arrabal in Rome, guest of spent two days with the Poets From Space, a group of poets from different Italian regions, chosen by Fabio Barcellandi.

Came out in June 2010, for Multimedia Publishing (Casa della Poesia from Baronissi – Salerno), his new collection of poems :it:Anche ora che la luna, with a letter from :it:Adele Cambria and :it:Lia Levi.
From 2011 began the partnership with the poet Stefania Battistella creating the new reading/show: "di me, di altri, ancora"

Publishing activity 
In 1976 he founded the publishing house Pellicanolibri, in promoting his work as editor of artists bashful, awkward or marginalized.
He rediscovers and publishes the stories of Luigi Capuana: Si conta e si racconta Pellicanolibri, 1989 and a volume that Federico De Roberto dedicated to his city, Catania. He also publishes the translated texts of the contemporary French philosopher Gaston Bachelard
From a meeting with Jodorowsky, the idea of publishing the book on the Panic Movement, a surrealist movement
founded by Alejandro Jodorowsky with Fernando Arrabal and Roland Topor.
In 1980 he translated and published the first work of the writer Manuel Vázquez Montalbán, Manifesto subnormal. It will be also editor of Gisèle Halimi, Luce d'Eramo, Alberto Moravia, Dario Bellezza, :it:Goliarda Sapienza, Arnoldo Foà, :it:Angelo Maria Ripellino.
Since 1982, with the poet Dario Bellezza gives life to the series Inediti rari e diversi in order to report the authors excluded from the Italian literary society, like Anna Maria Ortese.

From 1992 :it:Pellicanolibri becomes a great library on the edge of Rome. Here will reach authors from all parts of Italy and not only.

Beppe Costa and Bacchelli law 
In 1985 manages together with :it:Adele Cambria to make apply for the first time the :it:"Legge Bacchelli in favor of :it:Anna Maria Ortese.

Shows and Tours

Anche ora che la luna 
From January 2008, begins the tour of poetry and music :it:Anche ora che la luna. Initially, in Salento with the composer Giovanni Renzo at the piano, after alone and performing throughout Italy in places like the Literary Cafe in Rome and the Civic Theatre in Sassari. This tour will continue up to 2011.

Ho ancora voglia di sognare 
In 2009, began a collaboration with the French singer :fr:Eva Lopez, creating the show ho ancora voglia di sognare, interpreting poems in their context and in the encounter with the songs of Leo Ferré, Édith Piaf, Jacques Brel, Georges Brassens.

Di me, di altri, ancora 
In 2009, gets under way the new show "di me, di altri, ancora", touring around Italy(taken from the eponymous book forthcoming).
In 2012 the tour di me, di altri, ancora will restart with the poet Stefania Battistella.

Beppe, il poeta che amava le donne 
The director Ricky Farina produces the film "Beppe, il poeta che amava le donne" (Quixote production, 2009).

Ottobre in Poesia 
In 2009 he is the guest of honor at Ottobre in Poesia in Sassari, and in 2010 participates in numerous meetings with students from different schools of Sassari. At the end of the Festival Ottobre in Poesia, at the Civic Theatre in Sassari receives the poetics key of the city.

eVenti 2012 
On the occasion of 20 years since the birth of the library Pellicanolibri, begin (from February to June) a series of meetings that will see, among the guests, personalities such as Arnoldo Foà, :it:Adele Cambria, Paul Polansky, Jack Hirschman, Viorel Boldis, Alessandra Celletti, Dave Lordan, Andrea Garbin, Fabio Barcellandi, Don Backy and many others.

Our days 
In 2012 is invited at the 13th, then will be invited to the 14th and 15th, edition of the Nissan Festival which takes place in Maghar, (Israel) founded by the poet Naim Araidi.
From 2015 he is president of Terre di Virgilio Prize, from 2016 he is part of Francisco de Aldana Prize jury.
He began a collaboration with Era Buçpapaj, of the University of Tirana for several translations from English and Italian. In September 2019 he was invited to the International Poetry Festival in Kosovo, where he met the writer Luan Rama, who, a few days later, wrote an article for two newspapers in Tirana. (Schiptarja.com and Gazeta Schiptare)

Prize 
 Ragusa, libro siciliano dell'anno Prize, 1984
 Akesineide Prize 1987
 Alfonso Gatto Prize, 1990
 Città di Ascoli Prize, 1992
 International poetry prize "Il Delfino d'Argento", Nettuno, 1992
 Joppolo Prize, 1997
 Ciac per la poesia Prize (Castel Sant'Angelo, Rome), 2008
 Iceberg News per...parole... Prize, Teranova Festival (Villa Medici, Rome), 2008
 Career Award at "La Befana del Poliziotto 2009" Orione Teatre (Roma)
 Premio Internazionale Città di Ostia: career award, Roma 2012.
 Career Award at Nettuno PhotoFestival, Nettuno 2014
 Career Award at Nisan Festival Maghar (מע'אר, Israel)
 Prize Moniga 'Naim Araidi', Moniga del Garda, 2017
Prize Cultura Ambiente Umanità, Anzio Nettuno, Università Popolare, Fusibilia 8 marzo 2019

Works

Guides
  Catania, Guida ai monumenti, (with Luccjo Cammarata), Muglia editions
  Sicilia, Guida ai monumenti, (with Luccjo Cammarata), Muglia editions

Anthologies 
  Documento Sicilia, Giuseppe Di Maria editions
 Enotrio, a cura di Dario Micacchi, Jaca Book edizioni, '88
  Almanacco di Galleria, ed. Salvatore Sciascia, year I n. 2, '91
  Poesia '90, edited by Giorgio Weiss and :it:Riccardo Reim, ed. '90
  Poesia '90, edited by Giorgio Weiss and :it:Riccardo Reim, ed. '91
  ContrAppunti perVersi, 1990, Pellicanolibri
  Il Policordo, Rivista, edited by :it:Dante Maffia year VI n 2/3
  ConVersiAmo, 1991, Pellicanolibri
  Ponte degli angeli,1986, Scripta Manent
 L'amore, la guerra, RAI, Radiotelevisione italiana, a cura di Aldo Forbice, 2004, 
  Calpestare l'oblio edited by Davide Nota and Fabio Orecchini, 2010, Argo
  Acqua privata? no grazie, edited by Marco Cinque, 2011, Ilmiolibro
  Nisan – International Poetry Festival – Maghar, edited by Naim Araidi, 2012
 Heartfire – second revolutionary poets brigade, a cura di Jack Hirschman e Agneta Falk, 2013, Kallatumba Press, S. Francisco, 
 AA. VV. Manifest'Azioni dal Sottosuolo, a cura di A. Garbin, Seam Edizioni, 2014, 
  Poems for the Hazara, multilingual poetry anthology, 2014, 
 Jackissimo, antologia poetica dedicata a Jack Hirschman, a cura di A. Bava, Seam Edizioni, 2014, 
 AA. VV. SignorNò, poesie e scritti contro la guerra, a cura di M. Cinque e P. Rushton, Seam Edizioni, 2015, 
 AA. VV. Refugees, 15. Berlin International Literature Festival, 2015, Verlag Vorwerk, 
 AA. VV. Woher ich nicht zurückkehren werde, Berliner Anthologie, Verlag Vorwerk 8, 
 Raimondi Valeria; Costa Beppe; Hirschman Jack: Poetre II. Rrjedhë dallge që shtyn-L'onda dentro che sospinge, Gilgamesh Edizioni, 2016 
 No resignación. Antología de Salamanca, a cura di Alfredo Peréz Alencart, Depósito Legal: S. 504-2016 Impreso en Salamanca, en los talleres de Gráficas Lope, 2017
 AA. VV. SignorNò, poesie e scritti contro la guerra, a cura di M. Cinque e P. Rushton, Nuova edizione, Associazione Pellicano, 2016, 
 AA. VV. LiberAzione poEtica, pref. Jack Hirschman, Pellicano, 2017,
 AA. VV. Poeti da morire, a cura di Marco Cinque e Beppe Costa, Pellicano Sardegna, 2018, 
 AA. VV. Giornata mondiale della poesia, Roma 2020
 AA. VV. D'amori, di delitti, di passioni, a cura di Beppe Costa e Vito Davoli, 2022, ISBN 979-84-20347-91-1.
 AA. VV. SignorNò! a cura di Marco Cinque e Vito Davoli, 2022 ISBN 979-83-59054-91-1

Prose and Poetry 

  Una poltrona comoda, Vincenzo di Maria editor, 1970
  Un po' d'amore, Muglia editions, 1975
  Metamorfosi di un concetto astratto in due tempi con accompagnamento di ottavino, (with a foreword by Dario Bellezza), Pellicanolibri, 1982
  Romanzo Siciliano, Pellicanolibri, 1984
  Canto d'amore (with illustrations by Ivana Buschini), Pellicanolibri, 1986
  Fatto d'amore (with foreword by :it:Dante Maffia), Pellicanolibri, 1987, 
  Impaginato per affetto (with foreword by :it:Giacinto Spagnoletti), Pellicanolibri, 1989
  Il male felice, Pellicanolibri, 1992
  Due o tre cose che so di lei (with foreword by Luce d'Eramo), Pellicanolibri, 1995, 
  D'amore e d'altro (edited by Luce d'Eramo), Pellicanolibri, 1996, 
  Poesie per chi non sa fare altro, Pellicanolibri, 2002
  Anche ora che la luna, music CD with the composer Giovanni Renzo, 2009
  :it:Anche ora che la luna (with letter of :it:Adele Cambria), collections of poems, Multimedia editions  2010, 
 Rosso, poesie d'amore e di rivolta edited by Andrea Garbin, with foreword by Mauro Macario, VoloPress Edizioni, 2012
 La terra (non è) il cielo!, Gilgamesh Edizioni 2014, 
 Dell'amore e d'altre abitudini, con Stefania Battistella, Pellicanolibri Edizioni 2014, 
 L'ultima nuvola, Pellicano 2015, 
 Rosso, poesie d'amore e di rivolta, in appendice "Lettera d'amore non spedita", Pellicano Associazione Culturale, 2016. 
 Per chi fa turni di notte, Pellicano Associazione Culturale, 2017. 
 Romanzo siciliano – La trilogia, Pellicano Associazione Culturale, 2017.
 Il poeta che amava le donne (e parlava coi muri), Pellicano Sardegna, 2018, 
 Il poeta che amava le donne (e parlava coi muri), Pettirosso editore, 2019. 
Nicola Alesini, Beppe Costa, Metà del tempo, poesia a due voci, Alfa Music EAN 8032050021188

Notes

Bibliography

 1989 Salvatore Scalia, Il vulcano e la sua anima, Prova d'autore – (pag. 130)
 1995 :it:Vittoriano Esposito, L'altro Novecento nella poesia italiana – Critica e testi Volume I – Bastogi – (pagg. 162–165)
 2002 Luca Clerici, Apparizione e visione Vita e opere di :it:Anna Maria Ortese – Mondadori – (pagg. 530, 540, 561)
 2003 :it:Vittoriano Esposito, L'altro Novecento – La poesia "impura" – Bastogi – (pag. 148)
 2004 :it:Aldo Forbice (a cura di), L'amore e la guerra, RAI Eri, Ibiskos – (pag. 274)
 2006 :it:Vittoriano Esposito, L'altro Novecento – La poesia "onesta" – Bastogi – (pagg. 166–168)
 2006 Maurizio Gregorini, Il male di Dario Bellezza – Stampa alternativa – (pag. 158)
 2006 L'arcano fascino dell'amore tradito, tributo a Dario Bellezza – a cura di Fabrizio Cavallaro, – Giulio Perrone – (pag. 93)
 2008 Adelia Battista, Ortese segreta, Minimum fax – (pag. 61)
 2009 Arnoldo Foà, Autobiografia di un artista burbero, Sellerio – (pag. 134)
 2011 :it:Anna Maria Ortese Bellezza addio, Rosellina Archinto – (pag. 112)
 2015 Dario Bellezza, Tutte le poesie, Mondadori – (pag. XVII, XXXII, XXXIII)

Related items 
Pellicanolibri
:it:Legge Bacchelli
:it:Anna Maria Ortese
:it:Goliarda Sapienza

External links 
 Beppe Costa Blogspot
 Pellicanolibri Site

Italian poets
Italian male poets
20th-century Italian novelists
20th-century Italian male writers
Living people
1941 births
Italian male novelists